This is a list of awards and nominations received by American singer-songwriter Bryson Tiller. Three time Grammy Awards-nominated artist, Tiller signed a record deal with RCA Records in 2015 and released his debut studio album . In 2016, he received the award Best New Artist at the BET Awards, and was also nomination for the same award at the Billboard Music Awards, BET Hip Hop Awards, MTV Video Music Awards and Soul Train Music Awards. The lead single "Exchange" was nominated for Best R&B Song at the 59th annual ceremony.

In 2017, he collaborated with Rihanna on DJ Khaled's single "Wild Thoughts". The collaboration won a BET Awards, a Soul Train Music Awards and a iHeartRadio Music Awards. In 2018 Tiller duet with Jazmine Sullivan on "Insecure", being nominated at the NAACP Image Award.

In 2020 Tiller duet with H.E.R on "Could've Been", earning nominations at the MTV Video Music Awards and his second Grammy Awards nomination. The song was included in H.E.R. debut studio album, Back of My Mind, which was nominated for Album of the Year at the  64th Grammy Awards, becoming Triller's third nomination.

American Music Awards
The American Music Awards is an annual awards ceremony created by Dick Clark in 1973.

BET

BET Awards
The BET Awards were established in 2001 by the Black Entertainment Television (BET) network to celebrate African Americans and other minorities in music, acting, sports, and other fields of entertainment.

BET Hip Hop Awards
The BET Hip Hop Awards are hosted annually by BET for hip hop performers, producers, and music video directors.

Billboard Music Award
The Billboard Music Awards are held to honor artists for commercial performance in the U.S., based on record charts published by Billboard magazine.

BMI
The BMI Awards are annual award ceremonies for songwriters in various genres organized by Broadcast Music, Inc., honoring songwriters and publishers.

BMI R&B/Hip-Hop Awards

BMI Pop Awards

Grammy Awards
The Grammy Awards are awarded annually by the National Academy of Recording Arts and Sciences (NARAS).

iHeartRadio Music Awards
The IHeartRadio Music Awards is an international music awards show founded by IHeartRadio in 2014.

Kentucky Urban Entertainment Awards
The Kentucky Urban Entertainment Awards honors Kentucky musicians, DJs and others in the entertainment industry.

MOBO Awards
The MOBO Awards (an acronym for "Music of Black Origin") were established in 1996 by Kanya King. They are held annually in the United Kingdom to recognize artists of any race or nationality performing music of black origin.

MTV

MTV Video Music Awards
The MTV Video Music Awards was established in 1984 by MTV to award the music videos of the year.

MTV Europe Music Awards
The MTV Europe Music Awards was established in 1994 by MTV to award the music videos from European and international artists.

MTV Video Music Awards Japan
The MTV Video Music Awards Japan were established in 2002 to celebrate the most popular music videos from Japanese and international artists.

NAACP Image Awards
The NAACP Image Awardss is presented by the American National Association for the Advancement of Colored People to honor outstanding people of color in film, television, music, and literature.

Soul Train Music Awards
The Soul Train Music Awards is an annual award show aired in national broadcast syndication that honors the best in African American music and entertainment established in 1987.

References

External links
 

Tiller, Bryson